Sherlock James Andrews (November 17, 1801 – February 11, 1880), was an American lawyer and congressman.

Life 
He was born in  Wallingford, Connecticut, to Dr. John Andrews and Abigail Atwater.

He graduated from Union College, Schenectady, New York, in 1821 and studied law at Yale.  He married Ursula McCurdy Allen on December 1, 1828, and settled in Cleveland, Ohio. He was an intricate part of the early development of Cleveland as the first president of the city council and the public library board. He advocated for and promoted the building of the Cleveland & Pittsburgh Railway. In 1840 he was elected to the Twenty-seventh Congress on the Whig platform. In 1842 health issues compelled him not to seek nomination for a second term. He was appointed Judge of the superior court of Cleveland which he served from 1848 to 1850. Lost election in 1851 to the Ohio Supreme Court.  He was a delegate in the Ohio constitutional convention from 1850 to 1851. In 1859 at Wellington, Ohio, he was one of the attorneys defending the men who rescued John Price from "slave catchers". His political career ended serving as a delegate on the constitutional convention of 1873.

He was United States Attorney for the Northern District of Ohio in 1867.

References

Sources 
"Andrews, Sherlock James." Dictionary of American Biography. Vol. 1, Charles Scribner's Sons. 1928.

External links

1801 births
1880 deaths
People from Wallingford, Connecticut
American people of English descent
Whig Party members of the United States House of Representatives from Ohio
Ohio Republicans
Politicians from Cleveland
Lawyers from Cleveland
Ohio Constitutional Convention (1850)
Ohio Constitutional Convention (1873)
United States Attorneys for the Northern District of Ohio
Union College (New York) alumni
Yale Law School alumni
19th-century American lawyers